Aaron Hall (born 26 June 1998) is an Irish rugby union player who formerly played in the back row for Ulster.

He was educated at Ballyclare Secondary School, played club rugby for Ballynahinch, and was selected at age-grade level for Ulster. In 2015 he won the Ulster Youth Player of the Year Award. He joined the Ulster academy ahead of the 2016–17 season. He made his senior competitive debut the following season, starting in a 23–22 win against Benetton in the Pro14 on 24 November 2017. He played for Ulster 'A' in the 2017–18 British and Irish Cup, and the 2018–19 and 2019–20 Celtic Cup. He remained in the academy for a fourth year in 2019–20, but was no longer listed in the academy squad the following season. He joined Ballyclare RFC ahead of the 2020-21 season, having previously played for them at youth level.

References

1998 births
Living people
Irish rugby union players
Ulster Rugby players
Rugby union flankers